Hungarian National Party (MNP) was one of political parties of ethnic Hungarians in the First Republic of Czechoslovakia.

The party was founded in February 1920 in Komárom/Komárno as party of smallholders, under name Országos Magyar Kisgazda és Földműves Párt. From May 1925 it used name Országos Magyar Kisgazda, Földműves és Kisiparos Párt often abbreviated as Magyar Kisgazda Párt (Hungarian Party of Smallholders). In 1925 the name was changed to Magyar Nemzeti Párt. On June 21, 1936 the party merged with Országos Keresztényszocialista Párt (OKSZP, Provincial Christian-Socialist Party), another large Hungarian party into Egyesült Magyar Párt (EMP, United Hungarian Party) led by János Esterházy as national executive chairman (until then leader of OKSZP) and Andor Jaross as national chairman. The main objective of the party was initially an autonomy for ethnically Hungarian parts in Slovakia. This stance was later revised, and the party advocated a revision of the Trianon Treaty. In the economic sphere, the party advocated free market and called for government support for smallholders and peasants.

After establishment of Slovak State (1939) which had about 65,000 ethnic Hungarians the party (under name Szlovenskói Magyar Párt, Hungarian Party in Slovakia) remained as one of few allowed political parties (the others being Hlinka's Slovak People's Party and Deutsche Partei of ethnic Germans in Slovakia). During Slovak National Uprising (1944) the party was banned on the area controlled by insurgents. The ban was reconfirmed after the end of World War II.

Footnotes

References

Literature
 Publications by historian Ladislav Deák (Slovak Academy of Sciences).

Political parties established in 1920
Interwar minority parties in Czechoslovakia
Hungarians in Slovakia
Banned political parties
Hungarian minority interests parties